Ballylesson is a small village and townland in County Down, Northern Ireland. In the 2001 Census it had a population of 108 people. The village lies within the Lagan Valley Regional Park and the Lisburn City Council area.

Places of interest 
The Giant's Ring, a neolithic henge monument in state care, is between Edenderry and Ballylesson.

Religion
The Holy Trinity Church in Ballylesson is a listed building, built in 1788 and consecrated in 1789. It has a square tower at the west end with pinnacles at the corners of the tower. The tower also contains a set of eight change-ringing bells, the heavier five of which date to 1791, and were cast by the famous Rudhall foundry, in Gloucester.

References

Villages in County Down
Townlands of County Down